Abū al-Ḥasan ʻAlī ibn ʻAbdillāh ibn Jaʻfar al-Madīnī (778 CE/161 AH – 849/234) was a ninth-century Sunni Islamic scholar who was influential in the science of hadith. Alongside Ahmad ibn Hanbal, Ibn Abi Shaybah and Yahya ibn Ma'in, Ibn al-Madini has been considered by many Muslim specialists in hadith to be one of the four most significant authors in the field.

Biography
Ibn al-Madīnī was born in the year 778 CE/161 AH in Basra, Iraq to a family with roots in Medina now in Saudi Arabia. His teachers include his father, ʻAbdullāh ibn Jaʻfar, Ḥammād ibn Yazīd, Hushaym and Sufyān ibn ʻUyaynah and other from their era. His teacher, Ibn ʻUyaynah, said that he had learned more from Ibn al-Madīnī, his student, than his student from him.

Ibn al-Madīnī specialized in the disciplines of hadith, biographical evaluation and al-ʻIlal, hidden defects, in the sanad, chain of narration.   He was praised by other hadith specialists for his prowess in that field—by both his contemporaries, students and his teachers. ʻAbd al-Raḥmān ibn Mahdī, a scholar who preceded him, described Ibn al-Madīnī the most knowledgeable person of prophetic hadith.

His students include prominent hadith scholars in their own right. They include: Muḥammad ibn Yaḥyā al-Dhuhalī, Muḥammad ibn Ismāʻīl al-Bukhārī, Abū Dāwūd Sulaymān ibn al-Ashʻath al-Sijistānī and others. Al-Bukhārī, who went on the collect what is considered to be the most authentic collection of hadith in Sunni Islam, said that he did not consider himself diminutive in comparison to anyone other than Ibn al-Madīnī.

Al-Dhahabī lauded Ibn al-Madīnī as an imām and as exemplary to subsequent scholars in the field in hadith, a description he considered tarnished by Ibn al-Madīnī's adopted position in the theological inquisition of the ninth century. According to Al-Dhahabī, he adopted a position in favor of the Muʻtazilah regarding the uncreated origin of the Quran, but later regretted this and declared the claimant that the Quran was created as an apostate.

Ibn al-Madīnī died in Samarra, Iraq in June, 849/Dhu al-Qa'dah, 234.

Works

Al-Nawawī said Ibn al-Madīnī authored approximately 200 works some on subjects not previously written about and many not since superseded.
al-ʻIlal – on the subject of hidden defects (`ilal) in the sanads of hadith; of which a small segment has been published
Kitāb al-Ḍuʻafāʼ – on the subject of weak hadith narrators in the discipline of biographical evaluation
al-Mudallisūn – on the subject of hadith narrators who utilize ambiguous terminology in narrating
al-Asmāʼ wa al-Kunā – on names paidonymics
al-Musnad – a collection of hadith arranged by narrator
Kitab Ma'rifat al-Sahaba – The Book of Knowledge of the Companions

Early Islam scholars

References

Hadith scholars
8th-century people from the Abbasid Caliphate
Hadith compilers
778 births
849 deaths
Iraqi writers
Arab biographers
Iraqi Sunni Muslim scholars of Islam
Atharis
8th-century Arabs
9th-century Arabs
Biographical evaluation scholars